Pultenaea muelleri, commonly known as Mueller's bush-pea, is a species of flowering plant in the family Fabaceae and is endemic to Victoria, Australia. It is a dense shrub with hairy stems, elliptic to narrow egg-shaped leaves with the narrower end towards the base, and yellow and red flowers arranged singly or in pairs on the ends of short side shoots.

Description
Flowering occurs from November to January and the fruit is a hairy pod.

Taxonomy
Pultenaea muelleri was first formally described in 1864 by George Bentham in Flora Australiensis. The specific epithet (muelleri) honours Ferdinand von Mueller.

Distribution and habitat
Mueller's bush-pea grows on slopes in mountain forest and subalpine snow gum woodland mostly to the east of Melbourne.

References

External links
Herbarium specimen at Royal Botanic Gardens, Kew

Fabales of Australia
Flora of Victoria (Australia)
muelleri
Plants described in 1864
Endemic flora of Australia
[[Category:Taxa named by George Bentham